Shady is an unincorporated community in Douglas County, Oregon, United States. It is about two miles south of Roseburg on a stretch of Oregon Route 99 also known as the Oakland-Shady Highway. Shady is outside Roseburg's urban growth boundary, but it does have sewer service. Because of sewer availability, Douglas County considers Shady an "urban unincorporated area". It is next to the South Umpqua River.

Like nearby Green, Shady was a station on the Siskiyou Line of the Southern Pacific Railroad. A cliff in the area is named "Shady Point".

References

External links
January 30, 1897 New York Times story about a train robbery at Shady Point

Unincorporated communities in Douglas County, Oregon
Unincorporated communities in Oregon